The Vuelta a La Rioja is a regional Spanish road bicycle race held in La Rioja. From 2005 to 2008, it was a 2.1 category race on the UCI Europe Tour.

The event is facing financial challenges in 2009. Wrote velonews.com:
Economic woes in Spain have forced organizers to reduce the formerly three-day Rioja tour into a one-day race around the famous wine-growing region. Rather than risk not having any race at all, organizers opted to downsize in 2009 with hopes of reviving the stage-race format next season.

Winners

References

External links
  

UCI Europe Tour races
Rioja
Recurring sporting events established in 1957
1957 establishments in Spain
Sport in La Rioja (Spain)